An autochthon in structural geology is a large block or mass of rock which is in the place of its original formation relative to its basement or foundation rock.  It can be described as rooted to its basement rock as opposed to an allochthonous block or nappe which has been relocated from its site of formation.

While an autochthon may have experienced some minor shifting, an allochthonous block will have moved at least a few kilometres. If an overlying allochthon has an opening or hole which exposes the underlying autochthonous material, the hole is called a window or fenster.

Autochthonous sediment is sediment found at or very close to its site of deposition.

The etymology of the term is from Greek: 'autos' means self, and 'chthon' means earth.

See also
 Tectonics

References

External links

Structural geology